The Louisiana Pelican Classic was an annual golf tournament for professional women golfers on the Futures Tour, the LPGA's developmental tour. The event was a part of the Futures Tour's schedule from 2006 to 2009. It took place at The Wetlands Golf Course in Lafayette, Louisiana.

The tournament was a 54-hole event, as are most Futures Tour tournaments, and includes pre-tournament pro-am opportunities, in which local amateur golfers can play with the professional golfers from the Tour as a benefit for local charities. The benefiting charity from the Louisiana Pelican Classic is Goodwill Industries of Acadiana.

Winners

* Tournament shortened to 36 holes due to rain.

Tournament record

External links
Futures Tour official website

Former Symetra Tour events
Golf in Louisiana
Sports in Lafayette, Louisiana
Recurring sporting events established in 2006
Recurring sporting events disestablished in 2009
2006 establishments in Louisiana
2009 disestablishments in Louisiana
Defunct sports competitions in the United States